Věrní abonenti (Loyal members) is a Czech stage comedy play, written by Antonín Procházka.

Characters

Ríša
Petra
Dana
1st Actor
2nd Actor
Usher
Alexandra
Actress

Productions 
The play has been staged at the Eastern Bohemian Theatre in Pardubice and the Agentura Harlekýn in Prague, both times directed by Procházka and starring Václav Vydra as Ríša and Andrea Černá as Petra. The play was also adapted into a film in 2001.

Comedy plays
Czech plays
Plays by Antonín Procházka